Barbara Grzybowska-Świerkosz (born 1937), is a Polish chemist. She has been a professor since 1974.

Awards 
 Order of Polonia Restituta
 Medal Jana Zawidzkiego
 Golden Cross of Merit (Poland)

References 

21st-century chemists
21st-century Polish scientists
21st-century women scientists
Polish chemists
Polish women chemists
Physical chemists
Living people
1937 births
Date of birth missing (living people)
Place of birth missing (living people)
Recipients of the Order of Polonia Restituta
Recipients of the Gold Cross of Merit (Poland)